VitalityHealth is a United Kingdom-based company specialising in private medical insurance sold to the UK market. The company is a subsidiary of Discovery Limited and alongside VitalityLife and Vitality Corporate Services it forms Discovery Limited's UK insurance offering. As of 2018, the company had approximately 1 million customers in the UK.

VitalityHealth falls under one of the Vitality Group International companies. International partners include Generali (Europe), SoftBank & Sumitomo Life (Japan), Ping An Insurance (China), AIA Group (Asia and Australia), Manulife (Canada), John Hancock Financial (USA) and others.

Vitality has recently offered genetic testing to customers in South Africa and the United States and has built a business model based on psychological incentives and behavioural economics.

History 
The company was created in 2004 when Discovery and Prudential launched the PruHealth brand in the UK, combining Prudential's UK distribution capability with Discovery's Vitality product that had already been launched to the market in South Africa.

In April 2010, as part of Standard Life's decision to focus on its core pension and investment business, Discovery acquired Standard Life Healthcare (which had been formed in 1994 upon the acquisition of Prime Health Limited) and merged it with its PruHealth division.

In November 2014, Discovery purchased the remaining 25% stake in PruHealth from Prudential, thus making Discovery a sole owner of the company. Immediately after purchase, Discovery re-branded PruHealth to a new trade mark called VitalityHealth, and its sister company PruProtect rebranded to VitalityLife, both under the Vitality umbrella brand. An intensive advertisement campaign launched in print, digital and outdoor media was commissioned.

Discovery Limited and the work of Vitality Group International have been featured as a Harvard Business School case study.

References

External links 

Financial services companies established in 1994
Health insurance companies of the United Kingdom
Multinational joint-venture companies